Box Springs is an unincorporated community and census-designated place (CDP) in Talbot County, Georgia, United States. Box Springs has a post office with ZIP code 31801. 

It was first listed as a CDP in the 2020 census with a population of 303.

History
A post office has been in operation at Box Springs since 1853. The community was named for a local spring that was boxed in and used as a watering stop for the railroad.  Pipes were run from the "boxed-spring" to a water tower adjacent to the tracks. The name Boxed Spring was later changed to Box Springs, as it was easier to pronounce.

The Georgia General Assembly incorporated the place as the "Town of Box Springs" in 1913. The town's charter was dissolved in 1931.

Demographics

2020 census

Note: the US Census treats Hispanic/Latino as an ethnic category. This table excludes Latinos from the racial categories and assigns them to a separate category. Hispanics/Latinos can be of any race.

References

Census-designated places in Talbot County, Georgia